The Livigno Alps are a mountain range in the Alps of eastern Switzerland and northern Italy, around the Italian village Livigno. They are considered to be part of the Central Eastern Alps.

The Livigno Alps are separated from the Bernina Range in the south-west by the Bernina Pass; from the Albula Alps in the north-west by the Upper Engadin valley; from the Sesvenna Alps in the north-east by the Spöl valley; from the Ortler Alps in the east by the Passo di Fraéle and the upper Adda River valley (Valtellina).

The Livigno Alps are drained by the rivers Adda River, Inn and
Rom (tributary of the Adige).

Peaks
The main peaks of the Livigno Alps are:

Passes
The main passes of the Livigno Alps are:

See also
Swiss Alps
List of mountains in Switzerland

External links

Mountain ranges of the Alps
Central Alps
Rhaetian Alps
Mountain ranges of Switzerland
Mountain ranges of Italy
Mountain ranges of Graubünden
Limestone Alps